William Smith Peck Sr. (1873–1946) was a Democratic member of the Louisiana House of Representatives from Sicily Island in Catahoula Parish, Louisiana, having served from 1920–1928.

References

1873 births
1946 deaths
Democratic Party members of the Louisiana House of Representatives
People from Sicily Island, Louisiana
Businesspeople from Louisiana
Farmers from Louisiana
Methodists from Louisiana
19th-century Methodists
20th-century Methodists